The British Swimming Championships - 200 metres freestyle winners formerly the (Amateur Swimming Association (ASA) National Championships) are listed below.

The event was originally contested over 220 yards and then switched to the metric conversion of 200 metres in 1971.

In 1981 there was a dead-heat in the men's final.

200 metres freestyle champions

See also
British Swimming
List of British Swimming Championships champions

References

Swimming in the United Kingdom